Caner Çolak (born 30 June 1991) is a Turkish professional footballer who plays as a forward for Anadolu Üniversitesi.

References

External links

1991 births
Living people
Turkish footballers
Samsunspor footballers
Mardinspor footballers
Siirtspor footballers
24 Erzincanspor footballers
Sportspeople from Samsun
Association football forwards